Emerson is a city in Mills County, Iowa, United States. The population was 403 at the time of the 2020 census.

History
Emerson was a shipping point on the Chicago, Burlington and Quincy Railroad.

Geography
Emerson is located at  (41.018506, -95.401975).

Demographics

2010 census
As of the census of 2010, there were 438 people, 186 households, and 123 families living in the city.
There were 186 households, of which 26.9% had children under the age of 18 living with them, 55.4% were married couples living together, 8.1% had a female householder with no husband present, 2.7% had a male householder with no wife present, and 33.9% were non-families. 30.1% of all households were made up of individuals, and 18.8% had someone living alone who was 65 years of age or older. The average household size was 2.35 and the average family size was 2.87.

The median age in the city was 45.8 years. 21.9% of residents were under the age of 18; 5.6% were between the ages of 18 and 24; 21.8% were from 25 to 44; 31.5% were from 45 to 64; and 19.2% were 65 years of age or older. The gender makeup of the city was 48.6% male and 51.4% female.

2000 census
As of the census of 2000, there were 480 people, 195 households, and 133 families living in the city. The racial makeup of the city was 98.96% White, 0.21% African American, 0.21% from other races, and 0.62% from two or more races. Hispanic or Latino of any race were 0.62% of the population.

There were 195 households, out of which 31.3% had children under the age of 18 living with them, 59.5% were married couples living together, 7.7% had a female householder with no husband present, and 31.3% were non-families. 29.2% of all households were made up of individuals, and 16.9% had someone living alone who was 65 years of age or older. The average household size was 2.46 and the average family size was 3.03.

In the city, the population was spread out, with 26.0% under the age of 18, 4.6% from 18 to 24, 27.7% from 25 to 44, 25.8% from 45 to 64, and 15.8% who were 65 years of age or older. The median age was 38 years. For every 100 females, there were 88.2 males. For every 100 females age 18 and over, there were 86.8 males.

The median income for a household in the city was $31,583, and the median income for a family was $36,406. Males had a median income of $29,167 versus $21,250 for females. The per capita income for the city was $15,807. About 7.3% of families and 11.2% of the population were below the poverty line, including 21.2% of those under age 18 and none of those age 65 or over.

Education
The community is within the East Mills Community School District.

References

Cities in Iowa
Cities in Mills County, Iowa